is a Japanese "fast-steak" restaurant franchise popular in the Tokyo area.

Pepper Lunch is a subsidiary of Pepper Food Service Co., Ltd. The restaurant's Southeast Asian operations are managed by Suntory F&B International (in Asia) and Oishii Group in Australia and the U.S.

History

Pepper Lunch was created in 1994 by chef and inventor Kunio Ichinose, who wanted to serve quality fast food without hiring a chef. He devised a method using hot metal plates that are heated to 500 degrees Fahrenheit (260 Celsius) by an electromagnetic cooker. The raw meat with vegetables and/or rice are then placed on the plates, where they cook in front of the customer. The meat can be eaten rare or well done, depending on the customer's preference. The meal is then mixed with a choice of either the special honey brown sauce (Amakuchi) or garlic soy sauce (Karakuchi).

Restaurants
There are over 600 restaurants in East Asia, South East Asia, Australia and North America.

Incidents

E. coli O157 poisoning 
In September 2009, all branches in Japan temporarily closed after 38 customers, aged 2 to 81, suffered from food poisoning. The cause was E. coli O157 poisoning, which spread throughout 19 stores among 14 prefectures in Japan. A supplier of diced beefsteak was ordered to recall the E. coli-affected product.

References 

Fast-food chains of Japan
Food and drink companies based in Tokyo
Retail companies based in Tokyo
Restaurants established in 1994
1994 establishments in Japan
Multinational companies headquartered in Japan
Japanese brands
Suntory
Companies listed on the Tokyo Stock Exchange
Companies listed on the Nasdaq